The 1907–08 Scottish Division Two was won by Raith Rovers, with Cowdenbeath finishing bottom.

Table

References 

 Scottish Football Archive

Scottish Division Two seasons
2